Both Barrels Blazing is a 1945 American Western film directed by Derwin Abrahams and starring Charles Starrett.

Plot
The outlaw gangs are robbing the railroads and the Rangers cannot follow then when they move to New Mexico. So Kip decides to take a vacationto New Mexico and, as the Durango Kid, bring Cass and his gang back to justice. But Cass and his gang are killed at the bank in a double cross and kip must still find the loot. For this, he enlists the help of Tex and Grubstake, although Grubstake does not know it.

Cast
 Charles Starrett as Kip Allen/ The Durango Kid
 Tex Harding as Tex Harding
 Dub Taylor as Cannonball
 Pat Parrish as Gail Radford
 The Jesters as Musicians
 Guy Bonham as Singing Cowhand (as The Jesters)
 Walter Carlson as Singing Cowhand (as The Jesters)
 Dwight Latham as Singing Cowhand (as The Jesters)

See also
 List of American films of 1945

External links

1945 Western (genre) films
1945 films
American black-and-white films
Columbia Pictures films
Films directed by Derwin Abrahams